Paugnut State Forest is a Connecticut state forest located on four parcels in the towns of Torrington and Winchester. The forest's Arts and Crafts–style administration building was constructed by the Civilian Conservation Corps in 1937 and has been listed on the National Register of Historic Places. The remains of the foundation of the condensed milk factory established by Gail Borden on Burr Pond in 1857 may also be seen. Trails crossing the forest include the John Muir Trail which connects Burr Pond State Park and Sunnybrook State Park.

References

External links
Paugnut State Forest Connecticut Department of Energy and Environmental Protection
Paugnut State Forest Map Connecticut Department of Energy and Environmental Protection

Connecticut state forests
Parks in Litchfield County, Connecticut
Torrington, Connecticut
Protected areas established in 1929
1929 establishments in Connecticut
Civilian Conservation Corps in Connecticut